The magistrate of Yunlin County is the chief executive of the government of Yunlin County. This list includes directly elected magistrates of the county. The incumbent Magistrate is Chang Li-shan of Kuomintang since 25 December 2018.

Directly elected County Magistrates

Timeline

See also
 Yunlin County Government

References

External links 
 Magistrate - Yunlin County Government 
 

 
Yunlin County